Leonard Michael Jessup is an American academic administrator. He served as the tenth president of the University of Nevada, Las Vegas (UNLV) from 2015 to 2018, when he became the president of Claremont Graduate University.

Early life
Born and raised in Northern California, Jessup graduated from California State University, Chico, where he earned a bachelor's degree in information and communication studies and an MBA. He earned a Ph.D. in Organizational Behavior and Management Information Systems from the University of Arizona, Tucson.

Career
Jessup started his academic career as an associate professor of information systems at Indiana University's Kelley School of Business, where he held several roles including co-director of the Digital Communications Academy for the MBA Program. From 2000 to 2011, he held numerous roles at Washington State University, including as director of the Center for Entrepreneurial Studies and vice president of development for the WSU Foundation.

Jessup was a professor of entrepreneurship and innovation at the University of Arizona's Eller College of Management, where he held the Halle Chair in Leadership. He served as Eller's dean from 2011 to 2015.

Jessup served as the 10th president of the University of Nevada, Las Vegas from 2015 to 2018. He became the 12th president of Claremont Graduate University in April 2018.

In 2018 he was chosen as the recipient of the CEO Award by the Council for Advancement and Support of Education, District VII.

References

Living people
California State University, Chico alumni
University of Arizona alumni
Presidents of the University of Nevada, Las Vegas
Claremont Graduate University faculty
Business school deans
Year of birth missing (living people)